Claude Dufau (29 April 1946 – 9 June 2021) was a French rugby player and manager.

In 1958, he entered the Union sportive dacquoise's rugby school. On December 23, 1962, he was called up for the first time with the club, when he was only 16 years old.

References 

1946 births
2021 deaths
French rugby union players
French rugby union coaches
US Dax players
US Dax coaches
Sportspeople from Landes (department)